Achill-henge is a concrete structure on Achill Island off the northwest coast of County Mayo, Ireland. The term henge is used colloquially only and does not indicate genuine structural or cultural similarity to prehistoric monuments found in Ireland.

Structure
It consists of a circle of 30 concrete columns topped by a ring of stone. No care was taken to replicate or reference genuine stone circles in the region or the country. The term Achill-henge can be interpreted as a reference to the cultural inaccuracy of the structure in local context as typically henges are simply referred to as stone circles in Ireland.

History

Achill-henge was constructed over a weekend in November 2011 by Joe McNamara, a property developer and convicted criminal. A team of workers hauled the large concrete slabs up the hill and sank them in the bog.

Mayo County Council requested a court order to force McNamara to remove the edifice as it had been built without planning permission. McNamara claimed that the structure was exempt from planning rules as an "ornamental garden".

The High Court required McNamara to cease further work on the site, and, as he was found to be in breach of this, he was jailed for three days for contempt of court. The Court referred the planning decision to An Bord Pleanala, which in July 2012 upheld the Council's decision.

Some local people have expressed admiration for the work as a feat of engineering, and a newspaper poll found a majority of locals in support of keeping the structure.

On 8 January 2012, it was featured as part of the Prime Time programme on RTÉ 1 in Ireland.

Achill Henge is still standing as of February 2023.

Joe McNamara
Joe McNamara is noted in Ireland for a series of protests against Anglo-Irish Bank and the government's handling of the Irish financial crisis. In particular, he drove a concrete mixer truck into the gates of the Irish parliament building Leinster House, causing minor damage to the paintwork of the gateway. He was found not guilty of criminal damage or dangerous driving.

McNamara described Achill-henge as "a place of reflection".

See also 
In modern times a number of henge type monuments have been built, examples include:

Maelmin henge (2000) 
 Arctic Henge Raufarhöfn, Iceland (1996)
 Sark Henge (2015)
 A henge monument was restored at the Devil's Quoits in Oxfordshire restored between 2002 and 2008.

References

2011 sculptures
Outdoor sculptures in Ireland
Stonehenge replicas and derivatives
Buildings and structures in County Mayo
Achill Island